Derlin-1 also known as degradation in endoplasmic reticulum protein 1 is a membrane protein that in humans is encoded by the DERL1 gene. Derlin-1 is located in the membrane of the endoplasmic reticulum (ER) and is involved in retrotranslocation of specific misfolded proteins and in ER stress. Derlin-1 is widely expressed in thyroid, fat, bone marrow and many other tissues. The protein belongs to the Derlin-family proteins (also called derlins) consisting of derlin-1, derlin-2 and derlin-3 that are components in the endoplasmic reticulum-associated protein degradation (ERAD) pathway. The derlins mediate degradation of misfolded lumenal proteins within ER, and are named ‘der’ for their ‘Degradation in the ER’. Derlin-1 is a mammalian homologue of the yeast DER1 protein, a protein involved in the yeast ERAD pathway. Moreover, derlin-1 is a member of the rhomboid-like clan of polytopic membrane proteins.

Overexpression of derlin-1 are associated with many cancers, including colon cancer, breast cancer, bladder cancer and non-small cell lung cancer.

Discovery 
In 2004 the DERL1 gene was discovered independently by two research groups when they were exploring the machinery of retrotranslocation in the ER in the cell. One evidence for the existence of DERL1 was provided by Professor Tom A. Rapoport and his research group at Harvard Medical School, Boston, Massachusetts. Another evidence of the DERL1 gene was discovered by Professor Hidde L. Ploegh and his research group who is also at Harvard Medical School, Boston, Massachusetts. As the mammalian DERL1 gene was found to be a homologue of the yeast DER1 gene found in 1996, it was named after the yeast gene.

Gene location 
The human DERL1 gene is located on the long (q) arm of chromosome 8 at region 2 band 4, from base pair 123,013,164 to 123,042,423 (Build GRCh37/hg19) (map).

Function and mechanism

Rerouting factor during ER stress 
ER stress is caused by an accumulation of unfolded or misfolded proteins in ER and is critical for cell function. The accumulation of unfolded and misfolded proteins activates an unfolded protein response (UPR) which regulate the homeostasis of the cell. One of the strategies cells possess to ER stress as a quality control system is the ERAD pathway, by which Derlin-1 is a component of. As a part of an ER membrane protein complex (that includes VIMP, SEL1, HRD1, and HERP) derlin-1 detects misfolded proteins in ER and mediate them for their degradation in the ERAD pathway.

Under ER stress, the carboxyl-terminus region of derlin-1 captures specific misfolded proteins in the ER lumen. Derlin-1 also interacts with VIMP, an ER membrane protein that recruits the cytosolic ATPase p97 and its cofactor. The interaction of derlin-1 with p97 via VIMP is essential for export of misfolded proteins. p97 is required for the transport of the misfolded proteins through the ER membrane and back to the cytosolic side for their degradation. This process is referred to as retrotranslocation. Hence, one of the functions of derlin-1 is to reroute specific misfolded protein to the cytosol for their degradation. Prior to the cytosolic degradation, the retrotranslocated misfolded proteins interacts with HRDI E3 ubiquitin ligase. This ligase ubiquitinates the misfolded proteins promoting their degradation in the cytosol by the ubiquitin-protease system (UPS). Currently, the molecular mechanism by which derlin-1 reroutes the misfolded proteins from ER to their degradation are not fully understood.

The structure of Derlin-1 
The cryo-EM analysis revealed that human Derlin-1 forms a tetrameric channel across the ER membrane. Derlin-1 channel holds a short, large transmembrane funnel in the center of tetramer with a diameter about 11-13 angstrom, which might serve as a permeation pathway for misfolded protein substrates in ERAD. Each protomer in human Derlin-1 tetramer shares a high structural similarity with yeast DER1 protein or other rhomboid members.  However, this channel architecture makes human derlin-1 different from other known rhomboid structures and implies its centrtal role in mammalian ERAD retrotranslocation.

Clinical significance 

Derlin 1 (DERL1) is up-regulated in metastatic canine mammary tumors as part of the unfolded protein response.

Interactions 
Derlin-1 has been shown to interact with the following proteins:

 HRD1
 VIMP
 US11

See also 
 Derlin-2
 Derlin-3

References

Further reading